Germán Gabriel Leonforte (born 12 January 1981 in Rosario) is an Argentine football defender.

Honours

External links
 Profile at BoliviaGol.com 
 
 
 

1981 births
Living people
Argentine footballers
Argentine expatriate footballers
Association football defenders
Rosario Central footballers
Club Atlético Huracán footballers
Club Aurora players
Dorados de Sinaloa footballers
Coquimbo Unido footballers
Ferro Carril Oeste footballers
Argentine expatriate sportspeople in Chile
Expatriate footballers in Chile
Expatriate footballers in Bolivia
Expatriate footballers in Mexico
Expatriate footballers in Paraguay
Footballers from Buenos Aires